Norwegian Prosecuting Authority is a body subordinate to the Norwegian Council of State.

This body is responsible for legal prosecutions in Norway. It is divided into three levels. The third level of the Prosecuting Authority is the Police. The first two, the Office of the Director of Public Prosecutions and the Public Prosecutors, are called "the Higher Prosecuting Authority". Public Prosecutors work on a regional basis, whereas the Director of Public Prosecutions (Norwegian: Riksadvokat) has the coordinative leadership. When Tor-Aksel Busch resigned on 31 October 2019 he was the longest serving Riksadvokat in Norway's history.

Directors of Public Prosecutions
This is a list of the Directors of Public Prosecutions:

1889–1901 : Bernhard Getz
1901–1904 : Johan Blackstad (acting since 1891)
1904–1911 : Harald Smedal (acting since 1904)
1911–1929 : Peder Kjerschow
1929–1940 : Haakon Sund
1941–1945 : Jørgen Nordvik (collaborator during the German occupation of Norway) 
1945–1946 : Sven Arntzen (acting)
1946–1967 : Andreas Aulie
1968–1979 : Lauritz J. Dorenfeldt
1979–1986 : Magnar Flornes
1986–1997 : Georg Fredrik Rieber-Mohn
1997–2019: Tor-Aksel Busch
2019-present : Jørn Sigurd Maurud

See also
National Authority for Prosecution of Organised and Other Serious Crime

References

External link
Official site

Law of Norway
Government of Norway